Chris Christoffersen (born 13 August 1979) is a retired Danish professional basketball player. He played the majority of his career with Bakken Bears of the Danish Basketligaen. He is a ten-time Danish League champion, having been a stalwart with Bakken in 14 seasons. He has also had stints in Italy, the NBA Development League, Finland, Sweden and Australia.

Career
In the mid-1990s, Christoffersen moved to the United States to attend Nordhoff High School. At that time, he had only one year of organized basketball under his belt. He then played four years of college basketball for the Oregon Ducks between 1998 and 2002. In 93 career games for Oregon, he averaged 4.8 points and 3.1 rebounds per game.

His professional career began in Italy with Scavolini Pesaro during the 2002–03 season. He returned to the United States in 2003 where he played in the NBA Development League during the 2003–04 season for the Roanoke Dazzle and Fayetteville Patriots.

In 2004, Christoffersen returned to his home country of Denmark and joined the Bakken Bears for the 2004–05 season. In 2005–06, he split the season with Bakken and Finnish club Lappeenrannan NMKY.

For the 2006–07 season, Christoffersen played in Sweden for Södertälje BBK. In 2007, he returned to the Bakken Bears, where he played ever since, winning multiple League and Cup titles. Following the 2008–09 Danish League season, Christoffersen ventured to Australia for an off-season stint with the Willetton Tigers of the State Basketball League.

Christoffersen announced that he would retire after the 2018–19 season on 30 May 2019. Christoffersen finished his career as the all-time leader in games played and points for the Bears.

References

External links
 Eurobasket.com profile

1979 births
Living people
Bakken Bears players
Centers (basketball)
Danish expatriate basketball people in the United States
Danish expatriate sportspeople in Australia
Danish expatriate sportspeople in Finland
Danish expatriate sportspeople in Italy
Danish expatriate sportspeople in Sweden
Danish men's basketball players
Fayetteville Patriots players
Oregon Ducks men's basketball players
Roanoke Dazzle players
Södertälje Kings players
Victoria Libertas Pallacanestro players